Drusilla with a Million is a 1925 American silent drama film directed by F. Harmon Weight and written by Lois Zellner. It is based on the 1916 novel Drusilla With a Million by Elizabeth Cooper. The film stars Mary Carr, Priscilla Bonner, Kenneth Harlan, Henry A. Barrows, William J. Humphrey, and Claire Du Brey. The film was released on June 18, 1925, by Film Booking Offices of America.

Plot
As described in a film magazine review, Drusilla Doane, an inmate of an Old Ladies Home, when left $1,000,000 by Elias Arnold and uses the money to care for cast away children. Elias has also disinherited his son Collin. One of the babies now being cared for belongs to Sally May, the bride of Collin and a former orphanage inmate. Drusilla is brought into court because she has taken the child. Sally May is arrested for having left her husband, the reason being that his former fiancée influenced her to do so. The court rules in favor of Drusilla and Sally May, the bride and her husband are reunited.

Cast

Preservation status
A print of Drusilla with a Million resides in the Lobster Film archive, Paris.

References

External links

 
 
  Lobby card

1925 films
1920s English-language films
Silent American drama films
1925 drama films
Film Booking Offices of America films
American silent feature films
American black-and-white films
Films directed by F. Harmon Weight
1920s American films